Jevgēņijs Karavackis (born 11 August 1990) is a Latvian motorcycle speedway rider and member of the Latvian national team.

Career details

World Championships 
 Individual U-21 World Championship
 2008 - 9th place in the Qualifying Round 3
 2010 - 8th place in the Qualifying Round 1

European Championships 

 Individual European Championship
 2009 -  Tolyatti - 11th place (4 pts)
 Individual U-19 European Championship
 2009 -  Tarnów - 10th place (6 pts)
 Team U-19 European Championship
 2008 - 3rd place in the Qualifying round 2
 European Club Champions' Cup
 2008 - 3rd place in the Semi-Final for Szachtar Czerwonograd

Domestic competitions 
 Team Polish Championship (League)
 2007 - 2nd place in the Second League for Daugavpils (Average 1.458)
 2008 - 5th place in the First League for Daugavpils (Average 1.400)
 2009 - for Daugavpils

See also 
 Latvia national speedway team

References

External links 
 (ru) Riders of Lokomotive Daugavpils
 (ru) Riders of Lokomotive Daugavpils 2010

Latvian speedway riders
1990 births
Living people